Webstock is a web technology conference held in Wellington, New Zealand featuring a range of high-profile speakers covering a variety of web-related topics such as accessibility, usability, ethnographic design and development practices.

Webstock began in 2005 and was created by a small non-profit group (consisting of Mike Brown, Natasha Lampard (formerly Hall), Debbie Sidelinger and Ben Lampard).

Webstock 2006
Speakers at the first four-day Webstock in 2006 included Dori Smith, Roger Hudson, Russ Weakley, Rachel McAlpine, Douglas Bowman, Heather Hesketh, Russell Brown (PublicAddress), Tony Chor (Microsoft), Darren Fittler, Kelly Goto, Ben Goodger (Firefox / Google), Rowan Simpson (Trade Me), Donna Maurer, Joel Spolsky, Kathy Sierra, Andreas Girardet (creator of Yoper) and Steve Champeon.

Webstock 2008
The second Webstock ran from 10–15 February 2008, with speakers including Shawn Henry (W3C), Simon Willison (Django), Scott Berkun, Amy Hoy, Peter Morville, Nat Torkington, Dan Cederholm, Kelly Goto, Michael Lopp, Cal Henderson, Jill Whalen, Russell Brown, Jason Santa Maria, Rachel McAlpine, Sam Morgan (Trade Me), Tom Coates (Yahoo!), Liz Danzico, Damian Conway (Perl), Luke Wroblewski and Kathy Sierra.

Webstock 2009
The third Webstock ran from 16–20 February 2009, featuring: Jane McGonigal, Nat Torkington, Derek Powazek, Meg Pickard (Guardian Unlimited, Matt Jones and Matt Biddulph of Dopplr, Fiona Romeo, David Recordon (key contributor to OpenID and then Open Platforms Tech Lead for Six Apart), Cameron Adams, Pamela Fox, Adrian Holovaty, Heather Champ (Flickr), Michael Lopp. Ze Frank, Russell Brown, Derek Featherstone, Annalee Newitz, Joshua Porter, Toby Segaran, Jasmina Tesanovic, Russ Weakley, Ben Goodger, Tom Coates (Yahoo!), Bruce Sterling, and Damian Conway.

Webstock 2010
The fourth Webstock ran from 15–19 February 2010, featuring: Jeff Atwood, Shelley Bernstein, Daniel Burka, Ben Cerveny, Sebastian Chan, Mike Davidson, Regine DeBatty, Esther Derby, Brian Fling, Thomas Fuchs, Adam Greenfield, Lachlan Hardy, Lisa Herrod, Bek Hodgson, Amy Hoy, Mark Pesce, John Resig, Eric Ries, Rives (poet), Kevin Rose, Toby Segaran, Chris Shiflett, Scott Thomas and Jeffrey Veen.

Webstock 2011
The fifth Webstock ran from 14–18 February 2011.

Day 1 (Thursday 17 February)
Speakers:
 Frank Chimero - The Digital Campfire
 Michael Koziarski - That's all well and good, but how does it help me?
 Christine Perfetti - Adventurous Usability Techniques: Novel Approaches for the Seasoned Pro
 David Recordon - HTML5 at Facebook
 Mark Pilgrim - The Future of the Web: where are we going and why am I in this handbasket?
 Jason Webley - Portrait of an Artist as an Independent Musician
 Nicole Sullivan - CSS Tools for Massive Websites
 Jason Santa Maria - On Web Typography
 Steve Souders - Web Performance Optimisation: The Gift that Keeps on Giving
 Kristina Halvorson - Content/Communication
 John Gruber - The Gap Theory of UI Design
 Doug Bowman - Delivering Delight
 Amanda Palmer talks new music paradigm, blogging, Twitter and life

Day 2 (Friday 18 February)
Speakers:
 Marco Arment - Contrary to popular beliefs
 David McCandless - Information is Beautiful
 Glenda Sims - Practical Accessibility Testing
 Josh Clark - Buttons Are a Hack: The New Rules of Designing for Touch
 Jason Cohen - A Geek Sifts Through the Bullshit
 Peter Sunde - The Pirate Bay of Penzance
 Michael Lopp - An Engineering Mindset
 Tom Coates - Everything the Network Touches
 Scott McCloud - Comics: A Medium in Transition
 Merlin Mann - Mime The Gap

Webstock 2012
The sixth Webstock ran from 13–17 February 2012 and was attended by over 800 delegates.

Day 1 (Thursday 16 February)
Speakers:
 Kathy Sierra - MBU: Building the Minimum Badass User
 Jeremy Keith - Of Time and the Network
 danah boyd - Culture of Fear + Attention Economy = ?!?!
 Dana Chisnell - Deconstructing Delight: Pleasure, Flow, and Meaning
 Estelle Weyl - Mobile: Don't Break the Web
 Erin Kissane - Little Big Systems
 Ethan Marcotte - The Responsive Web Designer
 Nick Mihailovski - Acting on data
 Jennifer Brook - Within Reach: Publishing for the iPad
 Matt Haughey - Lessons from a 40-year-old
 Lauren Beukes - Kinking Reality
 Amy Hoy - Change the game
 Matthew Inman - How to get a buttcrapload of people to read what you write

Day 2 (Friday 17 February)
Speakers:
 Jared Spool - The Anatomy of a Design Decision
 Gabriella Coleman - In Lulz We Trust
 Scott Hanselman - It’s not what you read, it’s what you ignore
 Wilson Miner - When we build
 Raffi Krikorian - 3 things that turn out to matter (listed as "Pressure, defense, and responses")
 Rob Malda - Slashdot — the rise and fall
 Jessica Hische - Typography through song: an historical and epistemological journey
 Adam Lisagor - Lonely Pan Flute
 Michael B Johnson Making Movies is Harder than it Looks: Building Tools for Telling Stories
 Jenn Lim and Tony Hsieh - Delivering Happiness
 Derek Handley - Doing Good and Well

Webstock 2015

Webstock 2016

Webstock 2017
Webstock 2017 ran from 13 to 17 February 2017, with masterclasses on the first two days and the conference proper on the last two days. Scheduled speakers were Lindsay Aitchison; Genevieve Bell; Jonathon Colman; Anil Dash; Katie Dill; Janine Gianfredi; Kim Goodwin; Jeff Gothelf; Cal Henderson; Lara Hogan; Indy Johar; Sacha Judd; Tim Kadlec; Darius Kazemi; Patricia Moore; Ashley Nelson-Hornstein; Stefan Sagmeister; Jared Spool; Lisa Welchman; and Marcin Wichary.

Webstock Mini 
In between the major conferences, the group runs one day and evening events regularly throughout the year, featuring both New Zealand and International speakers.

References

External links
Webstock

Web-related conferences